Mozaffarabad (also Romanized as Moz̧affarābād) is a village in, and the capital of, Mozaffarabad Rural District of Baktash District of Miandoab County, West Azerbaijan province, Iran. At the 2006 National Census, its population was 1,707 in 340 households, when it was in Zarrineh Rud-e Shomali Rural District of the Central District. The following census in 2011 counted 1,912 people in 528 households. The latest census in 2016 showed a population of 1,994 people in 588 households. After the census, Zarrineh Rud Rural District was separated from the Central District, raised to the status of a district, and divided into two rural districts.

References 

Miandoab County

Populated places in West Azerbaijan Province

Populated places in Miandoab County